WBIM-FM (91.5 FM) is a non-commercial, educational radio station broadcasting 24/7 from the campus of Bridgewater State University. The station has a mostly alternative and indie rock format during regular automation, but the station does have many specialty shows which cater to such formats as R&B, Metal, Jazz, Hip Hop, sports, decade specific, and many other formats. Licensed to Bridgewater, Massachusetts, United States.  The station is currently owned by Bridgewater State University.

History
The station went on the air as WBIM on November 1, 1972 as a non-commercial 10 watt Class D FM station. On April 2, 1982 at 3:00 PM, WBIM-FM increased its power to the current 180 watts (ERP, H/V).  On July 7, 1982, WBIM-FM switched to Stereo at 7:00 PM with the playing of Queen's "Body Language" (no specific reason given, it was just what was on the turntable at the time).  On June 6, 1979 the station changed its call sign to the current WBIM-FM.

References

External links

BIM-FM
Radio stations established in 1972
Bridgewater State University
Bridgewater, Massachusetts
Mass media in Plymouth County, Massachusetts
1972 establishments in Massachusetts